Rubén Darío Enrique Scatolaro (born 3 February 1957 in Chajarí (Entre Ríos), Argentina), known as Darío Scatolaro, is an Argentine former professional footballer who played as a midfielder for clubs of Argentina, Chile and Spain.

Clubs
 Boca Juniors 1979
 Real Murcia 1979–1980
 Real Oviedo 1980–1981
 Gimnasia LP 1982–1983
 Deportes La Serena 1984
 Magallanes 1985
 O'Higgins 1986–1988
 San Luis 1989–1990
 Deportes Arica 1991
 Coquimbo Unido 1992–1994
 Magallanes 1995
 Santa Teresa 1996

Personal life
He is the father of the professional footballer Marcelo Scatolaro, who was born in San Bernardo, Santiago de Chile, when he played for Magallanes in Chile.

Honours
O'Higgins
  (1): 

Magallanes
 Tercera División de Chile (1):

References

External links
 

1957 births
Living people
Argentine sportspeople of Italian descent
Argentine footballers
Association football midfielders
Boca Juniors footballers
Real Murcia players
Real Oviedo players
Club de Gimnasia y Esgrima La Plata footballers
Deportes La Serena footballers
Deportes Magallanes footballers
Magallanes footballers
O'Higgins F.C. footballers
San Luis de Quillota footballers
San Marcos de Arica footballers
Coquimbo Unido footballers
Argentine Primera División players
Primera Nacional players
Chilean Primera División players
Primera B de Chile players
Tercera División de Chile players
Argentine expatriate footballers
Argentine expatriate sportspeople in Chile
Expatriate footballers in Chile
Argentine expatriate sportspeople in Spain
Expatriate footballers in Spain
Sportspeople from Entre Ríos Province